Villem Grünthal-Ridala, born Wilhelm Grünthal (30 May 1885 in Kuivastu, Muhu, Kreis Ösel, Governorate of Livonia - 16 January 1942 in Helsinki, Finland) was an Estonian poet, translator, linguist and folklorist.

Life

Villem Grünthal-Ridala was the son of an inn keeper on the island of Muhu. He first attended Hellamaa (Pühalepa)  parish school, then Eisenschmidt private school, as well as the national high school of Kuressaare. Beginning in 1905, he studied Finnish Literature at the University of Helsinki. In 1911 he completed his doctorate.

From 1910 to 1919 Grünthal-Ridala was a professor at the University of Tartu in Estonia. From 1910 until 1914 he edited Estonian Literature magazine (Eesti Kirjandus), as well as Üliõpilaste leht from 1914 to 1916.

From 1923 until his death, Grünthal-Ridala was professor of Estonian Language and Literature at the University of Helsinki. In 1941 he received a doctorate in Baltic-Finnic languages.

Lyrical poet

Villem Grünthal-Ridala had become renowned for his poems in the Estonian language. His epic Toomas ja Mai (1924), as well as a collection of ballads, Sinine kari (1930), served as a model for the Estonian poetry of the time. The poems are influenced by Impressionism, with the landscapes of his island homeland and life by the sea being the primary motifs. He belonged to the Estonian literary movement Young Estonia (Noor-Eesti), founded in 1905.

Selected Poems
 "Villem Grünthali laulud" (1908)
 "Kauged rannad" (1914)
 "Ungru krahv ehk Näckmansgrund"  (1915)
 "Merineitsit" (1918)
 "Saarnak" (1918)
 "Toomas ja Mai" (1924)
 "Tuules ja tormis" (1927)
 "Sinine kari" (1930)
 "Meretäht" (1935)
 "Laulud ja kauged rannad" (1938)
 "Väike luuleraamat" (1969)
 "Valitud värsid" (1986)
 "Püha Rist" (2005)

References

1885 births
1942 deaths
People from Muhu Parish
People from Kreis Ösel
Estonian male poets
Estonian translators
20th-century Estonian poets
20th-century translators
20th-century male writers
Estonian editors
Magazine editors
University of Helsinki alumni
Academic staff of the University of Tartu
Academic staff of the University of Helsinki
Burials at Hietaniemi Cemetery